Conical coordinates, sometimes called sphero-conal or sphero-conical coordinates, are a three-dimensional orthogonal coordinate system consisting of 
concentric spheres (described by their radius ) and by two families of perpendicular elliptic cones, aligned along the - and -axes, respectively. The intersection between one of the cones and the sphere forms a spherical conic.

Basic definitions

The conical coordinates  are defined by

 

with the following limitations on the coordinates

Surfaces of constant  are spheres of that radius centered on the origin

and

In this coordinate system, both Laplace's equation and the Helmholtz equation are separable.

Scale factors

The scale factor for the radius  is one, as in spherical coordinates. The scale factors for the two conical coordinates are 

and

References

Bibliography

External links
MathWorld description of conical coordinates

Three-dimensional coordinate systems
Orthogonal coordinate systems